Apaturopsis is a genus of butterflies in the family Nymphalidae.

Species
 Apaturopsis cleochares (Hewitson, 1873) – painted empress
 Apaturopsis kilusa (Grose-Smith, 1891)
 Apaturopsis paulianii Viette, 1962

External links
"Apaturopsis Aurivillius, 1898" at Markku Savela's Lepidoptera and Some Other Life Forms

Apaturinae
Nymphalidae genera
Taxa named by Per Olof Christopher Aurivillius